Kenneth Thomson, 2nd Baron Thomson of Fleet (1923–2006) was a Canadian billionaire businessman and art collector.

Ken or Kenneth Thomson may also refer to:

 Kenneth Thomson (cricketer) (born 1947), Australian cricketer
 Ken Thomson (footballer) (1930–1969), Scottish footballer (Aberdeen, Stoke City, Middlesbrough, Hartlepools United)
 Kenneth Thomson (actor) (1899–1967), American film actor born Charles Kenneth Thomson
 Kenny Thomson (born 1951), Scottish footballer (Dunfermline Athletic, St. Johnstone)
 Kenny Thomson (curler) (born 1969), New Zealand curling player

See also 
 Kenneth Thompson (disambiguation)